The Eight honors and Eight Shames also known as the Eight honors and Disgraces, is a set of moral concepts developed by former General Secretary Hu Jintao for the citizens of the People's Republic of China. It is also known as Eight Virtues and Shames, or Hu Jintao's Eight-Step Programme. Its formal name in China is Socialist Concepts on honors and Disgraces.

On March 4, 2006, Hu released this list calling it the "new moral yardstick to measure the work, conduct and attitude of Communist Party officials."  It is being promulgated as the moral code for all Chinese, especially Communist Party cadres.

Translation 
In October 2006 the Xinhua News Agency posted an English translation of the Eight Honors and Eight Shames:

See also 
 Scientific Development Concept
 Eight Musts
 Honour
 Shame

References 

Hu Jintao
Campaigns of the Chinese Communist Party
Ideology of the Chinese Communist Party
2004 documents
Codes of conduct